Eppin is a protein that in humans is encoded by the SPINLW1 gene.

This gene encodes an epididymal protease inhibitor, which contains both kunitz-type and WAP-type four-disulfide core (WFDC) protease inhibitor consensus sequences. Most WFDC genes are localized to chromosome 20q12-q13 in two clusters: centromeric and telomeric. This gene is a member of the WFDC gene family and belongs to the telomeric cluster. Alternatively spliced transcript variants encoding distinct isoforms have been found for this gene.

References

Further reading